Aleksandr Ivanovich Lazutkin (born October 30, 1957) is a former Russian cosmonaut.

Life and career 
Lazutkin attended the Moscow Aviation Institute and received a mechanical engineering degree. He was selected as cosmonaut on March 3, 1992. His first spaceflight was Soyuz TM-25, on which he was the flight engineer.

Lazutkin has said that Russian cosmonauts were given cognac for extended missions in space.

1997 Progress supply mission 
Lazutkin was aboard the Mir Space Station when a collision occurred with the unmanned Progress M34, its supply craft which was piloted by Vasily Tsibliyev while on the Mir. The collision, which is considered the worst in the history of the space age, knocked out the Spektr's solar panels and took the Mir out of its alignment with the sun, also causing it to lose power. It also caused the cabin to decompress.

Quick action by the three crewmen managed to stave off immediate disaster. Lazutkin and fellow crewman Michael Foale quickly severed the connecting cables with the module and sealed off the hatches to the module, saving the rest of the station. Lazutkin managed to successfully cut some of the wires connecting the Mir and the Spektr using a tiny dinner knife. A few days after the collision, Tsibliyev and Lazutkin were ordered to attempt to repair the Mir. Foale was ordered to the Soyuz-TM escape pod. The station was eventually secured safely.

References

1957 births
Living people
Moscow Aviation Institute alumni
Cosmonauts from Moscow
Heroes of the Russian Federation
Mir crew members